St Peter's Catholic School may refer to:

St Peter's Catholic School, Bournemouth, a secondary school in Bournemouth, Dorset, England
St Peter's Catholic School, Guildford, a secondary school in Guildford, Surrey, England
St Peter's Catholic School, Solihull, a secondary school in Solihull, West Midlands, England
St. Peter's Catholic School (Pine Bluff, Arkansas), an elementary school in operation 1889–1975 and 1985–2012
, a Catholic school in Aberdeen, Hong Kong, Hong Kong
, Aberdeen Island, Hong Kong Hong Kong
, Shek Pai Wan Estate, Aberdeen, Hong Kong

See also
St. Peter Catholic School (disambiguation)
St Peter's School (disambiguation)